Protodiplatys is an extinct genus of earwigs, in the family Protodiplatyidae, the suborder Archidermaptera, and the order Dermaptera. It is known from three species, P. fortis and P. gracilis, which are known from the Middle-Late Jurassic Karabastau Formation in Kazakhstan, and P. mongoliensis from the Aptian aged Gurvan-Eren Formation of Mongolia.

References

Dermaptera genera
Prehistoric insect genera